South Lakeland Airport  is a public airport located 13.5 miles south of the central business district (CBD) of Lakeland, a city in Polk County, Florida, United States. The airport covers 32 acres and has one runway.  The airport is also home to a regional skydiving company, Skydive Tampa Bay, Inc.

Gallery

See also 
Lakeland Linder International Airport

References 
Airport Master Record (FAA Form 5010), also available as a printable form (PDF)

External links 

Airports in Polk County, Florida
Lakeland, Florida